Matías Nicolás Fonseca (born 4 October 1995) is an Argentine professional footballer who plays as a forward.

Career
Fonseca started his career with local side Feliciano, prior to joining Lanús and subsequently Patronato. He first featured for the club's senior squad in May 2018, when manager Juan Pablo Pumpido selected him as a substitute for Primera División fixtures with Temperley and Banfield; though he didn't make an appearance in either encounter. Fonseca's professional debut arrived on 1 September 2018, when the forward was subbed on for the last eleven minutes of an away loss to Banfield. He made one more appearance, in October against Rosario Central, before departing on loan to Costa Rican club A.D. Municipal San Ramón in January 2019 for six months. After returning, he was loaned out once again, this time to Gimnasia y Esgrima.

After seventeen matches and two goals, scored home and away versus Boca Unidos, Fonseca returned from Torneo Federal A to his parent club in June 2020. However, he was soon released following the expiration of his contract.

In November 2020, Fonseca moved to Juventud Unida Universitario. In 2021, Fonseca played for Villa Ramallo.

Career statistics
.

References

External links

1995 births
Living people
Sportspeople from Entre Ríos Province
Argentine footballers
Argentine expatriate footballers
Association football forwards
Argentine Primera División players
Torneo Federal A players
Club Atlético Patronato footballers
Gimnasia y Esgrima de Concepción del Uruguay footballers
Juventud Unida Universitario players
Defensores de Belgrano de Villa Ramallo players
Argentine expatriate sportspeople in Costa Rica
Expatriate footballers in Costa Rica